Control Center (or Control Centre in most countries) is a feature of Apple Inc.'s iOS operating system, introduced as part of iOS 7, released on September 18, 2013. It gives iOS devices direct access to important settings for the device by swiping a finger up from the bottom of the display (or a swipe down from the top right corner on iPhone X and newer, and on all iPad models starting with iOS 12 or iPadOS). It is similar to the SBSettings tweak for iOS jailbreaking. The Control Center was also added to Macs in macOS Big Sur, released on November 12, 2020.

Usage
Control Center gives iOS users quick access to commonly used controls and apps. By swiping up from any screen – including the Lock screen (if the control center is set to be accessed from the lock screen) – users can do such things as switch on Airplane mode, turn Wi-Fi on or off, adjust the display brightness and similar basic functions of the device. 

Since iOS 7, it has also included an integrated flashlight function to operate the reverse camera's flash LED as a flashlight. The flashlight feature is only available on iPhone and iPod Touch, and iPad Pro. Beginning with iOS 9.3, a Night Shift toggle became available through the Control Center on all iPhone, iPod Touch and iPad models that have an Apple A7 chip or later.

Other functions are offered, such as the ability to turn Bluetooth, and Do Not Disturb on or off; lock the screen's orientation; play, pause, or skip a song, see what is playing; connect to AirPlay-enabled devices; and quickly access the clock, calculator, and camera apps. Users also have access to AirDrop, previously only available on Macs and newly added to iPhone, iPad, and iPod Touch models using the Lightning connector in iOS 7, as a method of transferring files between Apple devices.

Design
In iOS 7 through iOS 9, Control Center featured a single-paged slide up panel with a blurred background, which provided a layer of translucency over the content below. The design for the most part remained the same, aside from a few small, occasional changes. Due to the intense resources needed to create a blurred effect, iPhone 4, iPad 2, and iPad 3 do not feature a translucent background, and instead feature a grey background with slight transparency without blur.

In iOS 10, Control Center morphed into a card-like design with a white background, and was separated into three separate cards accessible by swiping horizontally. The first card consisted of main device controls, such as Wi-Fi, Bluetooth, and Do Not Disturb, while the second page was dedicated to media controls, and the third page for controlling HomeKit enabled devices linked in the Home application.

Control Center received a significant redesign in iOS 11, unifying its different pages into one and allowing users to 3D Touch (or long press on devices without 3D Touch) the icons for additional options, and vertical sliders allow users to adjust volume and brightness. Control Center is customizable via the Settings app, and allows for a wider range of settings features to be shown, including cellular service, Low Power Mode, and a shortcut to the Notes app. 

iOS 12, released in 2018, brought a few new additions to Control Center, with Do Not Disturb being updated to allow 3D Touching or long pressing the icon to access a menu of preset durations of a Do Not Disturb session. With the 2020 release of iOS 14 and iPadOS 14, Control Center received a few other new additions, like sleep tracking, sound recognition and a Shazam toggle. While in 2021, Control Center received a new Focus option and a new Keyboard Brightness option in iOS 15 and iPadOS 15. And in 2022, with the release of iOS 16 and iPadOS 16, Control Center's sound recognition Shazam feature now integrates its history with the main Shazam application's history, instead of the histories being separated.

Reception
Control Center has received generally positive reviews. In contrast for the user having to access the Settings application to change most preferences, Darrell Etherington of TechCrunch thought that "separating [Control Center] from that function and making it accessible throughout the iOS user interface via a simple swipe up from bottom is a really big improvement."

The iOS 11 update was criticized for changing the way the buttons for Wi-Fi and Bluetooth work; more specifically, the toggles would disconnect devices from Wi-Fi or Bluetooth, while leaving the radios on. The Electronic Frontier Foundation stated that this change not only hurt battery life, but was also bad for security, describing the buttons as turning Wi-Fi and Bluetooth "off-ish" (greyed out, but not crossed out, as it would appear if switched off directly from the Settings app), as well as further criticizing the connections resuming at 5:00 am every day.

References

External links
 Control Center on Apple
 

IOS software
MacOS software